Winterfox (WFX) was an esports organization with teams competing in Counter-Strike: Global Offensive, Halo and Street Fighter. The team was founded after the Evil Geniuses League of Legends team split from the organization following the creation of a new sponsorship rule for the League of Legends Championship Series, and the team later expanded into other games. Winterfox signed Super Smash Bros. Melee Sheik player DaJuan "Shroomed" Jefferson McDaniel on July 16, 2015. The Winterfox Halo team competes in the Halo Championship Series. Winterfox signed fighting games player Gustavo "801 Strider" Romero to the team on July 15, 2015. In November 2015 Winterfox's CSGO team moved to SteelSeries's headquarters in Chicago, Illinois. Winterfox's League of Legends team competed in the North American League of Legends Championship Series (NA LCS) in for the 2015 Spring NA LCS split before being relegated and eventually disbanding.

Roster

Counter-Strike: Global Offensive 
 Alexander "LeX" Deily
 Kyle "flowsicK" Mendez
 Todd "anger" Williams
 David "Xp3" Garrido
 Vilen "xtrm"Gaifejian
 Warren "hades" Rettich

Former 
 Jacob "pyth" Mourujärvi
 Jonatan "Devilwalk" Lundberg
 Derek "desi" Branchen
 Lucas "TPPFrost" Leibforth

Halo 
 Dilon "Randa" Rand
 Ryan "Ryanoob" Geddess
 Ryan "Shooter" Sondhi
 Thomas "Domey" Loffredo
 Jay "rekt 'em" LeSlaye

Street Fighter V 
 Gustavo "801 Strider" Romero 
 Miky "XsK_Samurai" Chea

References

External links 
 

Defunct and inactive Super Smash Bros. player sponsors
Halo (franchise) teams
Counter-Strike teams
Fighting game player sponsors
2015 establishments in California
 
Former North American League of Legends Championship Series teams
Esports teams established in 2015